Stamp or Stamps or Stamping may refer to:

Official documents and related impressions
 Postage stamp, used to indicate prepayment of fees for public mail
 Ration stamp, indicating the right to rationed goods
 Revenue stamp, used on documents to indicate payment of tax
 Rubber stamp, device used to apply inked markings to objects
 Passport stamp,  a rubber stamp inked impression received in one's passport upon entering or exiting a country
 National Park Passport Stamps
 Food stamps, tickets used in the United States that indicate the right to benefits in the Supplemental Nutrition Assistance Program

Collectibles
 Trading stamp, a small paper stamp given to customers by merchants in loyalty programs that predate the modern loyalty card
 Eki stamp, a free collectible rubber ink stamp found at many train stations in Japan

Places
 Stamp Creek, a stream in Georgia
 Stamps, Arkansas

People
 Stamp Fairtex, mixed martial artist
 Stamp or Apiwat Ueathavornsuk (born 1982), Thai singer-songwriter
 Stamp (surname), people surnamed Stamp or Stamps
 Stamps family, American surname

Manufacturing
 Stamping (metalworking), a process in which metal is formed with a press
 Stamps, the heavy weights used to crush ore in a stamp mill
 Leather stamping, a leatherworking process
 Progressive stamping, a manufacturing process
 Stamp sand, a by-product of stamp mills

Other uses
 Stamps (album), a 1979 album by saxophonist Steve Lacy
 "Stamp", a song by the Rural Alberta Advantage from the 2011 album Departing
 BASIC Stamp, a microcontroller
 Stamps, a nickname for the Calgary Stampeders football team
 Stomp (strike), a downwards kick using the heel that outside North America is called a stamp
 STAMP (accident analysis), System Theoretic Accident Modeling and Process, an accident analysis framework developed by Nancy Leveson

See also
Stamped (disambiguation)